Valter Bonacina (born 30 July 1964) is an Italian association football coach and former player who played as a midfielder.

Career

Playing career
He spent the majority of his career playing for Atalanta (10 seasons, 7 of which in Serie A) and A.S. Roma (3 seasons), and retired in 2002.

Coaching career
From 2003 to 2007 he served as assistant manager of Atalanta. In July 2007 he was then moved in charge of the Allievi Regionali youth team, and was successively promoted at the helm of the Primavera under-19 team in July 2009.

On 8 January 2010 he was then appointed head coach of Atalanta in a caretaker role, following Antonio Conte's resignation from his managerial position at the club. He then guided Atalanta on a Serie A Week 19 game ended in a 0–1 away loss to Palermo on 10 January 2009 and returned to his previous role after Bortolo Mutti was appointed as head coach the very next day.

On 10 June 2011 he was announced as new head coach of Lega Pro Prima Divisione club Foggia.

He coached the Under-19 squads in several clubs from 2012 to 2021. On 21 June 2021, he was hired as a head coach by Serie D club Villa Valle. He resigned on 3 November 2021, following a poor start to the season.

References

1964 births
Living people
Footballers from Bergamo
Italian footballers
Italian football managers
A.S. Roma players
Atalanta B.C. players
A.C. Monza players
Atalanta B.C. managers
Serie A players
Serie B players
Serie C players
Serie D players
A.C. Rodengo Saiano players
Serie A managers
Serie C managers
Serie D managers
Virtus Bergamo Alzano Seriate 1909 players
Association football midfielders
Atalanta B.C. non-playing staff